Braewick may refer to:

Braewick, Sandsting, a settlement in the West Mainland, Shetland, Scotland
Braewick, North Mainland, a farmstead in the North Mainland, Shetland, Scotland

See also
Breiwick, a village in the Central Mainland, Shetland, Scotland
Breiwick Burn, Whalsay, Shetland, Scotland
Breiwick Road, a street in Lerwick, Shetland, Scotland